Agrotis ipsilon, the dark sword-grass, black cutworm, greasy cutworm, floodplain cutworm or ipsilon dart, is a small noctuid moth found worldwide. The moth gets its scientific name from black markings on its forewings shaped like the letter "Y" or the Greek letter upsilon. The larvae are known as "cutworms" because they cut plants and other crops. The larvae are serious agricultural pests and feed on nearly all varieties of vegetables and many important grains.

This species is a seasonal migrant that travels north in the spring and south in the fall to escape extreme temperatures in the summer and winter. The migration patterns reflect how reproduction occurs in the spring and ceases in the fall.

Females release sex pheromones to attract males for mating. Pheromone production and release in females and pheromone responsiveness in males is dependent on the juvenile hormone (JH) and pheromone biosynthesis activating neuropeptide (BPAN). In the span of 2 months, the moth progresses through the life cycle stages egg, larvae, pupa, and adult. Throughout this time period, this moth faces the risk of predation and parasitism, such as by Hexamermis arvalis or by the parasite Archytas cirphis.

Description
38–48 mm. Antennae in male bipectinated. Forewings brown, reddish-tinged, mixed with pale greyish-ochreous, costa and sometimes median area suffused with dark fuscous ; first and second lines edged with dark fuscous; spots outlined with black, reniform followed by a short black dash ; subterminal line obscure, usually preceded in middle by two fine black marks. Hindwings whitish-grey or whitish, terminally suffused with fuscous. Larva ochreous brownish or bronzy-grey, sides sometimes greenish ; dorsal, subdorsal, and spiracular lines faintly darker or lighter, usually darker-edged ; head sufFusedly brown-marked.

Geographic range
Populations of this species have been found in southern Canada, 48 of the United States (and additionally Hawaii), Mexico, Central and South America, Australia, New Zealand, the Pacific Rim, North Africa, Europe, and Asia. However, they are absent from some tropical regions and colder areas and are more widespread in the Northern than Southern Hemisphere.

This species is also known to migrate north in the spring and migrate south in the fall.

Food resources

Caterpillars 
Larvae feed on weeds such as bluegrass, curled dock, lambsquarters, yellow rocket, and redroot pigweed. They will often eat all the weeds available before moving to attacking crops. Favored crops include most vegetable plants, alfalfa, clover, cotton, rice, sorghum, strawberry, sugarbeet, tobacco, and occasionally grains and grasses.

Adults 
Adults feed on flower nectar. They are also attracted to deciduous trees and shrubs such as linden, wild plum, crabapple, and lilac. They are a pollinator of fetterbush lyonia.

Parental care

Oviposition 
Based on the types of debris on the ground, the black cutworm prefers to oviposit in areas with fencerow (pasture) debris rather than corn field debris, woodland floor debris, and bare soil. Fencerow debris includes dry grass debris, and this may be attractive for females to oviposit early in the spring before rapid vegetation growth occurs.

After this growth, though, the moths are drawn more to low, dense plants such as the curled dock and yellow rocket. These plants have multiple stems and many low-lying basal leaves. On most plant species, the cutworm prefers to oviposit on the leaves rather than the stem.

Life history

Life cycle 
In a given year, the number of generations differs based on location and weather conditions. In Canada, there are 1 or 2 generations, while in the United States, there are 2 to 4 per year. This species is abundant in warmer temperatures (such as Arkansas, US) during the late spring in May–June and early fall in September and October, while they are more abundant in cooler temperature (such as New York, US) during the summer in June and July. One life cycle lasts between 35–60 days.

Egg 
The egg stage lasts 3 to 6 days. Females oviposit eggs in clusters on low-lying leaves. If such host plants are not available, the females will oviposit on dead plant material. However, they will not lay eggs on bare soil. Females can deposit eggs singly, or in groups of up to 1200 to 1900 eggs.

The nearly spherical eggs are initially white but turn brown with age. The surface of the egg possesses 35–40 ribs that radiate from one apex.

Caterpillar 
The larval stage lasts 20–40 days. Over the span of 5 to 9 instars, the caterpillar body grows from 3.5 mm to a maximum of 55 mm. Larval development is optimized at a temperature of 27 degrees Celsius, and instars 1–5 are most successful at higher humidities. By the 4th instar, the larva becomes light sensitive and spends most of the daylight underground. The larvae are considered pests because they damage the plant tissue under the soil. The larvae are cannibalistic. The larva can range in color from light gray or gray brown to black. The ventral side is usually lighter, and this species does not have a dorsal band. The entire body is covered with granules and the head possesses many dark spots.

Pupa 
The pupal stage lasts 12–20 days. This species pupates under the soil approximately 3–12 mm below the surface.

The pupae appear to be dark brown and are 17–12 mm long and 5–6 mm wide.

Adult 
One complete generation from egg to adult lasts 35–60 days. The female preoviposition period lasts 7–10 days.

Adults have a wingspan of 40–55 mm. The forewings are dark brown, and the distal area has a light irregular band a black dash mark. The hindwings are whitish to gray and have darker colored veins.

Nature Of Damage 
Gram cutworms are active in the Rabi season and damage the crop.

 In India, winter is generally the lean season for insects and pests. But cutworms belong to that small insect group. Those who damage the Rabi crop by their destructive activity.
 cutworms cut the plant down into the ground or twist the whole plant like a gram, hence it is known as a cutworm.
 cutworm is also known as a surface caterpillar because it is a sai surface and performs its activities a few centimetres.
 The larva of Gram cutworm causes great damage to the crop. Its larva disappears during the day and comes out in the evening to damage the crop.
 First of all, they feed on the epidermis of the fallen leaves or green leaves touching the ground letter caterpillar cut the leaf, shoot the plant just above the ground level, and buried in the soil.
 cutworm damages many plants causing serious damage. It attacks the gram field between November and February.

Migration 
A. ipsilon are seasonal migratory insects that travel south in the fall to escape harsh cold temperatures and travel north in the spring to escape extremely warm weather. Therefore, changes in thermoperiod as well as photoperiod may influence the onset of migration patterns in this species. Before migration southward in the fall, the reproductive system in both females and males shuts down to prevent copulation before winter. In the spring and early summer, though, before migration north, females release sex pheromones soon after eclosion. In one study, female moths collected from late April to early May were 100% mated.

Enemies

Predators 
Several species of wasps prey on the black cutworm. Larvae parasitized by Meteorus leviventris, a type of parasitoid, eat 24% less vegetation and cut 36% fewer seedlings. Other parasitoids include several fly species such as Archytas cirphis, Bonnetia comta, Eucelatoria armigera and Sisyropa eudryae. Ground beetles also eat black cutworm larvae. Ants, specifically Lasius neoniger also prey on this species and feed on A. ipsilon eggs.

Parasites 
An entomopathogenic nematode called Hexamermis arvalis is known to infect 60% of larvae in the central United States. This parasite ultimately kills the insect. The parasite thrives in moist soil conditions.

Mating

Female calling behavior 
Calling behavior is the act of females releasing sex pheromones in preparation for mating. Calling behavior increases within the first three days after eclosion but decreases as the females grow older. As well, as the females grow older, they onset time of calling behavior occurs earlier. Calling earlier allows older females to have increased mating success as they normally produce less sex pheromone and need to appear more attractive than younger females. The amount of sex pheromone in the body and calling behavior are coordinated on a time scale.

Pheromone biosynthesis activating neuropeptide 
Females produce a sex pheromone in the pheromone gland on their abdominal tips that attracts males for mating. Biosynthesis of the sex pheromone is controlled by a neurohormone called pheromone biosynthesis activating neuropeptide (PBAN). This 33-amino-acid-long peptide is present in both sexes in the brain-suboesophageal ganglions (Br-SOG) during both scotophase and photophase. It has been shown that the juvenile hormone is involved in the release of PBAN in both males and females. PBAN aids in pheromone production in females and pheromone responsiveness in males. In another species, PBAN release has been shown to be stimulated by external factors including photoperiod, temperature and odorants from host plants

Juvenile hormone  
The juvenile hormone (JH), released by the corpora allata (CA), is necessary for the production and release of the sex pheromone. The CA releases JH which acts on the production/release of the PBAN-like factor. So, PBAN is what connects the network in the CA to the central nervous system's production of sex pheromone. When the CA was removed, calling behavior and sex pheromone production stopped. As well, ovaries remained underdeveloped when the CA was absent. However, when decapitated females (meaning complete absence of the CA) were injected with a synthetic form of JH, ovaries were able to develop. This indicates that JH acts on the ovaries and production of sex pheromone in two independent neuroendocrine systems.

In males, JH is necessary for pheromone responsiveness. When the CA was removed, males did not respond to female sex pheromones with sexual behavior. However, when the CA was implanted back, responsiveness and sexual behavior returned.

Physiology

Olfaction 
A. ipsilon has a sensitive olfactory system with many proteins that are expressed in the antennae. Such proteins include odorant binding proteins (OBPs), chemosensory proteins (CSPs), odorant receptors (ORs), ionotropic receptors (IRs) and sensory neuron membrane proteins (SNMPs). These proteins are responsible for recognizing sex pheromone and general odorants, such as those released by host plants.

Interactions with humans

Pest of crop plants 
Each larva can consume over 400 square centimetres of foliage during its development. They feed above ground until about the fourth instar. After that they do considerable damage to crops by severing young plants at ground level. In the midwestern US, the black cutworm is considered to be a serious pest of corn. Corn is very susceptible at the one-leaf stage, but by the four- or five-leaf stage, it is relatively unaffected. Damage to the underground parts of plants can also be harmful. Other crops where serious damage occurs include cotton, maize, tobacco, sunflower, tomatoes, sugar beet and potato.

Management 
There are three options to manage cutworm population and the incurred damages. Soil insecticides can be applied as a pre-plant treatment, although this may be limited by the unpredictability of cutworm population density distribution. These insecticides can also be applied as a planting-time treatment, although the same limitations still hold. The third option would be a rescue treatment that is applied after the infestations have occurred; this is also called the wait-and-see system. This may also be preferable due to a recently lower occurrence of outbreaks.

See also
 Army cutworm (Euxoa auxiliaris)
 Variegated cutworm (Peridroma saucia)
 Brown cutworm (Agrotis munda)

References

External links

Kimber, Ian "73.327 BF2091 Dark Sword-grass Agrotis ipsilon (Hufnagel, 1766)". UKMoths. Retrieved 28 June 2019
 Taxonomy

Lepiforum e.V.

Agrotis
Moths described in 1766
Agricultural pest insects
Owlet moths of Africa
Cosmopolitan moths
Taxa named by Johann Siegfried Hufnagel
Insect pests of millets